Benjamin Bourne (September 9, 1755September 17, 1808) was a United States representative from Rhode Island, a United States district judge of the United States District Court for the District of Rhode Island and a United States Circuit Judge of the United States Circuit Court for the First Circuit.

Education and career

Born on September 9, 1755, in Bristol in the Colony of Rhode Island and Providence Plantations. Bourne was the son of Shearjashub Bourn, a lawyer who eventually served on the Rhode Island Supreme Court.
Like his father, Bourne graduated from Harvard University in 1775, received a Master of Arts degree from the same institution in 1778, and read law. He was quartermaster of the Second Rhode Island Regiment in 1776. He was admitted to the bar and commenced practice in Providence, Rhode Island. He was a deputy in the Rhode Island General Assembly in 1780 and from 1787 to 1790. He was clerk of the Rhode Island General Assembly from 1780 to 1786. He was a Justice of the Peace in Providence from 1785 to 1790.

Congressional service

Upon the ratification of the United States Constitution by the State of Rhode Island, Bourne was elected as a Pro-Administration candidate from Rhode Island's at-large congressional district to the United States House of Representatives of the 1st through the 3rd United States Congresses and as a Federalist to the 4th and 5th United States Congresses and served from August 31, 1790, until his resignation on October 13, 1796, before the close of the 4th United States Congress.

Federal judicial service

Bourne received a recess appointment from President George Washington on October 13, 1796, to a seat on the United States District Court for the District of Rhode Island vacated by Judge Henry Marchant. He was nominated to the same position by President Washington on December 21, 1796. He was confirmed by the United States Senate on December 22, 1796, and received his commission the same day. His service terminated on February 20, 1801, due to his elevation to the First Circuit.

He was confirmed by the Senate on February 20, 1801, and received his commission the same day. His service terminated on July 1, 1802, due to abolition of the court.

Later service and death

Following his departure from the federal bench, Bourne resumed private practice in Providence and Bristol from 1801 to 1808. He died on September 17, 1808, in Bristol. He was interred in Juniper Hill Cemetery in Bristol.

Family

Bourne was a first cousin  once removed of Massachusetts United States Representative Shearjashub Bourne.

References

External links

 Benjamin Bourne Papers, Rhode Island Historical Society

 

1755 births
1808 deaths
18th-century American judges
Burials at Juniper Hill Cemetery
Continental Army officers from Rhode Island
Federalist Party members of the United States House of Representatives from Rhode Island
Harvard College alumni
Judges of the United States circuit courts
Judges of the United States District Court for the District of Rhode Island
Members of the Rhode Island House of Representatives
People from Bristol, Rhode Island
People of colonial Rhode Island
United States federal judges appointed by George Washington
United States federal judges appointed by John Adams
United States federal judges admitted to the practice of law by reading law